Palava  is a 2022 Nigerian family comedy film produced by Inkblot Productions in conjunction with FilmOne Entertainment, released to Cinemas on 9 December 2022, the film stars Richard Mofe-Damijo, Bisola Aiyeola, Iyabo Ojo, Mercy Aigbe, Beverly Naya, Beverly Osu, Neo Akpofure, Chinedu Ikedieze, Segun Arinze, Eniola Badmus. InkBlot Productions has described the film as 'a family comedy that perfectly fits into the Christmas festive season'.

Synopsis 
Palava tells the story of a high life musician, Osa Wonda played by Richard Mofe-Damijo a renowned musical artiste with five daughters and massive love for women whose life and family unluckily began to turn upside down when a scandal becomes revealed on the eve of his 60th birthday.

Selected cast 

 Richard Mofe-Damijo as Osa Wonda
 Beverly Naya as Charlie
 Bisola Aiyeola
 Iyabo Ojo
 Mercy Aigbe
 Neo Akpofure
 Beverly Osu
 Eniola Badmus
 Chinedu Ikedieze
 Jemima Osunde

Production and release 
Palava which is Inkblot Productions twentieth film was directed by Niyi Akinmolayan and started showing in cinemas nationwide on 9th, December 2022. The premiere was held on 27 November 2022 and it was an ankara-themed event that saw various celebrities in attendance dressed in accordance to the theme, most actors and actresses that starred in the movie were present for the premiere as well as others who didn't star in the movie such as Nancy Isime, Sharon Ooja, Ruth Kadiri and others.

References 

2022 films
Nigerian drama films
2022 comedy-drama films
Nigerian comedy-drama films
2020s English-language films